The Mexican nobility were a hereditary nobility of Mexico, with specific privileges and obligations determined in the various political systems that historically ruled over the Mexican territory.

The term is used in reference to various groups throughout the entirety of Mexican history, from formerly ruling indigenous families of the pre-Columbian states of present-day Mexico, to noble Mexican families of Spanish and other European descent, which include conquistadors and their descendants (ennobled by King Philip II in 1573), untitled noble families of Mexico, and holders of titles of nobility acquired during the Viceroyalty of the New Spain (1521–1821), the First Mexican Empire (1821–1823), and the Second Mexican Empire (1862–1867); as well as bearers of titles and other noble prerogatives granted by foreign powers who have settled in Mexico.

The Political Constitution of Mexico has prohibited the State from recognizing any titles of nobility since 1917. The present United Mexican States does not issue or recognize titles of nobility or any hereditary prerogatives and honors.  Informally, however, a Mexican aristocracy remains a part of Mexican culture and its hierarchical society.

Indigenous Mexican nobility

Pre-Columbian nobility 

The Mexica, Maya, Olmec, Zapotec, Mixtec, Purépecha, Tlaxcaltec, and many other Indigenous peoples of present-day Mexico developed strong hierarchical societies based on hereditary privileges and obligations which were passed down to individuals in regards to the historical roles played by their ancestors in politics, war and religion. Society was firmly divided between the ruling elites and the governed masses, often making use of specific royal titles like Tlatoani, Tlatoque or Cazonci, in reference to rulers and members of ruling families. The organization of members of noble families in military orders (as the eagle and jaguar warriors), as well as in political functions (as calpixques), derived in the establishment of a hereditary aristocracy with similar characteristics to those found in other parts of the World, often using titles like that of Pipiltin or Pilli in reference to individuals of noble lineage.

Indigenous nobles under Spanish rule 
  When the Spanish first arrived in present-day Mexico (1518), indigenous rulers and nobles headed the defense of their territories against the invaders, soon after signing peace treaties and alliances to ensure the survival of their people.  In this process, many indigenous peoples ended up participating in the military conquests of the Spanish Empire, gaining recognition of their ancient privileges as well as earning new ones due to their merits in the conquest of the Americas. In accordance to Spanish tradition under the Habsburg dynasty, the Crown of Castile recognized the pre-existing social organization of the native peoples and assimilated their ancient elites to the new regime, often offering them the same conditions as nobles of Spanish extraction. In this way, the Spaniards respected the native systems and added to them, sometimes resulting in many unions between Aztec and Spanish nobility.

During Spanish domain, indigenous nobles were referred to as caciques (term imported from the Antilles), maintaining political relevance as rulers of the repúblicas de indios (self-governed indigenous states), as well as receiving access to educational institutions (such as the Jesuit colleges and the Royal and Pontifical University of Mexico), as well as accessing Spanish institutions of organized nobility (like the Spanish military orders). At the time, religious convents were intended for specific social and ethnic groups, being the convents of indias cacicas some of the most privileged (such as the Corpus Christi convent in Mexico City). Nevertheless, the succession laws of Spanish tradition slowly permeated the Amerindian traditions, altering access to this elite class to patrilineal descendants of ancient rulers, in opposition to the mixed-lineal descent of their ancient traditions.

While numerous indigenous families and individuals were recognized as nobles by the Crown of Castile, certain populations who were specially active in the conquest and colonization of what was later known as the New Spain were also distinguished with collective nobility, this included the Tlaxcalan and Quauhquecholan peoples, who collectively gained the condition of hidalgos, a privilege that had only been received by the Basque people of the Iberian Peninsula. Many of these nobles resettled into western and northern Mexico to help pacify tribes there.

Some Amerindian nobles, like the Mixtec Villagómez family, were among the richest landowners in the New Spain, retaining their Mixtec identity, speaking the Mixtec language and even keeping a collection of valuable Mixtecan documents. Nevertheless, most indigenous nobles lost their privileges at the fall of the Spanish Empire, losing all recognition, as with all Mexican nobles, with the birth of the modern Mexican Republic.

The Imperial House of Moctezuma 

 Amongst the descendants of the pre-Columbian rulers of present-day Mexico who received special distinctions under Spanish rule, none were more privileged than the descendants of Emperor Moctezuma II of the Mexica. The Emperor's son, Don Pedro de Moctezuma Tlacahuepan, formed a mayorazgo and settled in Seville, where his eldest grandson received the titles of Count of Moctezuma (later elevated to Duke of Moctezuma, Grandee of Spain, becoming part of the Spanish nobility), Viscount of Ilucán, Lord of Monterrojano, as well as the investiture as Knight of the Order of Santiago. In 1696, the husband of the 3rd Countess of Moctezuma was named Viceroy of the New Spain, being created Duke of Atrisco (or Atlixco) in 1704. Other historical members of the family include Doña Isabel de Moctezuma, Don Manuel Holgado-Moctezuma, 1st Marquess of Moctezuma, Doña María Isabel de Moctezuma, 1st Marchioness of La Liseda, Don Vicente de Moctezuma, 9th Marquess of Cerralbo, amongst others. The modern-day Kingdom of Spain still legally recognizes all of these titles, despite the Mexican Republic opposing all recognition. In addition to the titles and other privileges the King Charles I of Spain (also Emperor Charles V of the Holy Roman Empire) offered the descendants of Emperor Moctezuma II a compensation of five-hundred ducats to be paid every year in perpetuity for the use by the capital city of water sources and lumber in their private estate in Mexico City. This payment was only interrupted in 1938 during the presidency of Abelardo L. Rodríguez, being contested until this day by the Countess of Miravalle and other notable descendants. The present Ambassador of Mexico to the United States of America, Esteban Moctezuma, is descended from this family.

Nobility of the Viceroyalty of the New Spain

Nobleza de Indias or "Nobility of the Indies" 
The Spanish conquest of present-day Mexico brought with it the implementation of its political, religious, economical and social system, which included the legal division of society between nobles and plebeians ("sociedad estamental", see Estates of the realm), a system which subsisted during the entirety of Spanish rule (in present-day Spain the distinction was only abolished at the second half of the 19th century). In addition to the pre-existing families belonging to ancient indigenous nobility, new ones were added, including European families whose nobility was pre-existing prior to their arrival to the Americas, and others whose nobility was gained through the available resources of the day, including participation in the conquest, founding and settling of the Indies (as determined in the Ordenanzas de Segovia, promulgated by King Philip II in 1573). In this process, the conquistadors, founders, first settlers, and their descendants, received recognition of the same noble condition as their European and indigenous counterparts ("hijosdalgo y personas nobles de linaje y solar conoçido"), forming a diverse and multicultural elite that has been known to historians as "Nobleza de Indias", or "Nobility of the Indies". Nobles from both ethnic extractions shared territorial, political and military power, and participated together in religious and public ceremonies, nevertheless, marriages between both groups where rare after the 16th century, with both units responding to different interests and unique set of traditions. In most cases, the "noble class" was formed by provincial hidalgos of Spanish extraction who held local political and military power, and whose fortunes varied greatly from one territory to another, depending on the local resources and opportunities for production and commerce.

The hacienda was the archetypical symbol of the power of the "Nobleza de Indias", although some even more privileged nobles also held ownership of urban palaces as well as extensive cattle-ranches and mines (at the 18th century, silver mines in the New Spain had surpassed the Peruvians as the most productive in the World). The intricacies of this society were described by Prussian scientist and explorer Alexander von Humboldt in his "Political Essay of the Kingdom of the New Spain".

Noble titles and knighthoods 

Most nobles had the consideration of hidalgos (untitled nobles) whilst an amount no larger than one-hundred and twenty individuals were granted higher-ranking titles of nobility during the three-hundred years of Spanish rule known then as títulos de Castilla (or "titles of Castile"), including those of Viscount, Count, Marquess and Duke. The title of Señor (equivalent to Lord) was often used informally by holders of encomiendas, specially during the 16th century, although there is no proof that such a title was ever explicitly granted by the Crown. Knighthoods of Spanish military orders (Order of Santiago, Alcántara, Calatrava and Montesa) where also granted to members of the nobility, and were less rare at the end of the 18th century, although they could not be considered entirely common. Knights of foreign orders of nobility (like the Order of Saint John or the Order of Christ) were also existent but even rarer than their Spanish equivalents.

The first title granted to a settler in the kingdom of New Spain was that of Marqués del Valle de Oaxaca (Marquess of the Valley of Oaxaca), received by conquistador Hernán Cortés, who was also knighted in the Order of Santiago. Subsequently, others received similar distinctions, including Don Rodrigo de Vivero, a Capitain-General who was made Conde del Valle de Orizaba); Don Pedro Tesifón de Moctezuma, made Conde de Moctezuma de Tultengo); and Don Agustín de Echeverz, governor of the Kingdom of Nuevo León, granted the title of Marqués de San Miguel de Aguayo), amongst many others.

The largest number of Novohispanic noble titles were created in the eighteenth century under the Spanish Bourbon monarchs and were added to by an influx of foreign nobles to Mexico.

The noble titles of New Spain were:

 Marqués del Valle de Oaxaca (1529); Hernán Cortés and descendants
 Marqués de Salinas de Río Pisuerga (1609); Altamirano de Velasco, Cervantes
 Conde de Santiago de Calimaya (1616); Altamirano de Velasco, Cervantes
 Marqués de Villamayor de las Ibernías (1617); Pacheco
 Conde de Valle de Orizaba (1627); Rincón Gallardo
 Conde de Moctezuma (1627) G.E.; Moctezuma de la Cueva
 Marqués de San Miguel de Aguayo (1683); Echevers
 Conde de Miraflores (1689); Garrastegui
 Marqués de la Villa de Villar del Águila (1689); Urrutia
 Conde de Miravalle (1690); Dávalos Bracamonte
 Marqués de Santa Fe de Guardiola (1691); Padilla, López de Peralta, Cervantes
 Marqués de Altamira (1704); Sánchez de Tagle
 Marqués de las Torres de Rada (1704); Lorenz de Rada 
 Marqués de Sierra Nevada (1708) ; Ruiz de Tagle
 Marqués de Salvatierra (1708); Cervantes
 Duque de Atrisco (1708); G.E.; Sarmiento, Romay-Sotomayor
 Conde de Ledesma de la Fuente (1710)′
 Marqués de Villa Hermosa de Alfaro (1711); Rincón-Gallardo
 Conde de San Mateo de Valparaíso (1727); Landa y Escandón
 Marqués de Acapulco (1728); de la Cerda
 Marqués de San Clemente (1730); Busto
 Marqués de las Salinas (1733); Pérez de Tagle
 Conde de Revillagigedo (1749); Revillagigedo
 Marqués de Rivascacho (1764); Cervantes
 Conde de Regla (1768); Romero de Terreros, Rincón Gallardo
 Marqués del Apartado (1772); Fagoaga, Campero
 Conde de la Presa de Jalpa (1775); Cervantes
 Marqués de San Cristóbal (1777); Romero de Terreros, Rincón Gallardo
 Marqués de San Francisco (1777); Romero de Terreros
 Marqués de Guanajuato (1798); Siles
 Conde de Pérez Gálvez (1805); Pérez-Gálvez
 Marqués de Guadalupe Gallardo (1810); Rincón-Gallardo
 Marqués de Yermo (1810); Gabriel de Yermo and descendants (with the right to choose denomination)
 Conde de Heras-Soto (1811); Heras Soto, García Pimentel

The nobility in the process of Independence 

The process of Mexican independence, as well as others in the former Spanish Americas, was led by members of the local nobility. Initially, members of the provincial nobility such as Miguel Hidalgo, Ignacio Allende, and others, were amongst the first to form an insurrection against the Napoleonic control over Spain and its Empire. Nevertheless, other members of the nobility, like the future Emperor Agustín de Iturbide, Ignacio de Elizondo, the Count of Casa Rul, amongst others, led the resistance against the former insurrectionists. When the Spanish resistance to Napoleon gathered in the city of Cádiz in the year 1812 to form what would later be named as the Courts of Cádiz, representatives were summoned from all points of the Empire to organize and fund the resistance (as well as to define the First Constitution of the Kingdom of Spain signed in 1812). This process also had prominent members of the New-Spanish nobility, such as Don José María Gutiérrez de Terán (who served as president of the Courts), Don Octaviano Obregón (a grandson of the 1st Count of La Valenciana), Don Miguel Ramos (de Arreola) Arizpe (himself a descendant of Bartolomé de Medina), Don José Simeón de Uría y Berrueco (vice-presidente of the Courts and defender of racial equality), Don José Miguel Gordoa (president of the Courts, later bishop of Guadalajara), etc.

Almost ten years after the fall of the first insurrection, Agustín de Iturbide, then commander of the Spanish forces in central Mexico, led the definitive rebellion against Spanish rule, with the aid of many other titled and untitled nobles. Amongst the signers of the Mexican Declaration of Independence are Don Juan José Espinosa de los Monteros, the Marquess of Salvatierra de Peralta, Don José María Fagoaga (a nephew to the Marquess del Apartado), the Count of Heras Soto, Don Francisco Manuel Sánchez de Tagle (from the family of the Marquess of Altamira and the Count of San Mateo de Valparaíso), the Marquess of San Juan de Rayas, the Count of Santiago de Calimaya-Marquess of Salinas del Río Pisuerga, Don Juan Cervantes y Padilla (from the latter family), Don José Manuel Velázquez de la Cadena (from one of Mexico's prominent families), Don Nicolás Campero y Bustamante (related to the Counts of Alcaraz and Casa Flórez), the Count of Regla, the Marquess of San Miguel de Aguayo, Anastasio Ruiz de Bustamante (later president of Mexico), etc.

Nobility of the First Mexican Empire 

The independence of the Mexican Empire from Spain happened as an emancipation of powers with a continuity of the precedent political, social, economical and religious system. The first treaty of independence, known as the Treaty of Córdoba, proposed the transferral of King Ferdinand VII of Spain from Europe to Mexico (with the title of Emperor of Mexico), emulating the transferral of Don Pedro IV of Portugal to Brazil a few months before, due to the rise of liberalism in the Iberian Peninsula. The King however, never embarked for Mexico, for which a regency was appointed, and after a social uprising, a new Emperor was sought and later proclaimed in the figure of Agustín de Iturbide. He was the military commander that, once a royalist, turned and led the process of independence (himself a member of the hidalgo class). The new Emperor recognized all pre-existing titles of nobility, as well as nobiliary conditions prescribed under Spanish law, and only granted a few princely dignities to members of his family (including his children and his father, who was proclaimed Prince of the Union), as well as three other titles of nobility, all of which were ratified by the Congress, such as that of Marqués de Samaniego del Castillo (which was already under application with the Spanish Crown). Knighthoods were also created, most notably, the Imperial Order of Guadalupe.
 
The fall of the First Mexican Empire was followed by the prohibition of use of titles of nobility, from the First Mexican Republic, action which was responded by many nobles with the junction of the prefix "ex" to their titles ("ex-marqués de..", "ex-conde de...", etc.).

The Imperial House of Iturbide 

The family of Emperor Agustin I had titles created for them such as Mexican Prince, Princess of Iturbide, and Prince of the Union. After the fall of the First Empire shortly after its rise, the imperial family was exiled from Mexico, residing firstly in Italy, and later, in the United States of America. The failed return of the ex-Emperor to Mexico was shortly ended after his arrival with his execution. The headship of the house passed then to his eldest son Don Agustín Jerónimo de Iturbide, who had been proclaimed Prince Imperial by the Mexican Congress of 1822. In 1855, a plan to restore the monarchy in Mexico, proclaimed Prince Agustín Jerónimo as the new Emperor of Mexico, but never came into effect. In 1865, one year after the proclamation of the Second Mexican Empire under the House of Habsburg-Lorraine (see below), Don Agustín (son of Agustín Jerónimo), Don Salvador, and Doña Josefa de Iturbide were proclaimed Princes of Iturbide with the treatment of Highness, ranking just below the new Imperial Family, and put under the tutelage of the new Emperor (never adopted, contrary to popular belief).

Return to Exile 

The fall of the Second Mexican Empire, retook the Iturbide family to exile, where they’ve stayed ever since. During the Porfiriato, Agustín, Prince of Iturbide, Agustin I’s grandson and Maximilian I’s adopted son, who had graduated from Georgetown University, renounced his claim to the throne and title. He returned to Mexico and served as an officer in the Mexican army. But in 1890, after publishing articles critical of President Porfirio Díaz, he was arrested on charges of sedition and sentenced to fourteen months of imprisonment. He returned to Georgetown University, as a professor of the Spanish and French languages, and died childless in 1925. Several branches still subsist, most notably through the other adopted son Salvador, being registered and recognized by the Almanach de Gotha.

Nobility of the Second Mexican Empire

The 19th century was a time of great political and military turmoil in Mexico, with repetitive wars against the Kingdom of Spain, the Kingdom of France and the United States of America, as well as internal wars provoked by the different visions that the ruling classes had over the ideal model of the new nation. After having lost more than half of its territory to the United States of America, and facing excruciating financial debt, some believed the restoration of a stable monarchy was the best option forward for the restitution of order in a country devoured by its irreconcilable differences. In 1859, Archduke Maximilian of Habsburg-Lorraine, the Viceroy of Lombardy-Venetia (brother to Emperor Franz Joseph of Austria) was first approached by Mexican monarchists led by José Pablo Martínez del Río—with a proposal to become the emperor of Mexico. The Habsburg family had ruled the Viceroyalty of New Spain from its establishment (see above). 

The quest of restitution of the monarchy had begun long before, ever since the deposition of Emperor Agustín I by General Antonio López de Santa Anna (styled His Serene Highness by the Mexican Congress), who preferred, as many others the candidacy of a Bourbon or Habsburg prince (for their historical relation with the Spanish Empire), instead of that of a local provincial hidalgo. After many negotiations between Napoleon III, his Mexican supporters, and foreign powers, the candidacy of Maximilian was accepted and he arrived in Mexico in 1864.

Several members of the old Mexican nobility were enthusiastic about the monarchical restitution and even traveled to Miramar Castle to officially offer the Mexican crown to the Archduke and his wife Charlotte of Belgium (daughter of King Leopold I of the Belgians), who later was known as Carlota. 

Contrary to his supporters expectations, the new emperor was a profound liberal, who did little to reinforce the powers of the conservatives, the Catholic Church, or the ancient Mexican nobility (which were his only supporters). During his short reign he re-established the Imperial Order of Guadalupe (which had also been active during the rule of López de Santa Anna), he also founded the Imperial Order of the Mexican Eagle (precedent to the present Order of the Aztec Eagle), and the Imperial Order of San Carlos (given to ladies of the Court and to foreign princesses). During his short lived Empire, the Imperial Court was filled with Austrian, German, French and Italian nobles (several of which stayed in Mexico after the fall of the Empire), who were sometimes at odds with the old Mexican nobles. He invited liberal politicians to his government and his court, and often gave them membership to the Imperial Orders, as well as appointing their consorts ladies-in-waiting to the Empress. Although his Court implicitly recognized all pre-existing titles (as well as those of the foreigners who accompanied him), nothing was done to give them official status, the only new titles which were given were those of the Princess Iturbide. The Emperor and Empress did not have any offspring (rumors of a miscarriage were as close as it got), for which no surviving Imperial family claims the succession of the house.

Other notable Mexican noble families 

Leading noble families active in 17th through 19th century politics, economy, clergy, arts and culture of Mexico included: De la LLamosa, Gómez de Cervantes, Romero de Terreros, de la Cámara or Cámara, Rincón-Gallardo, Romay, Riverol, Pérez Gálvez, Rul, Vivanco, La Canal, Cañedo, Fernández de Jáuregui, Obando, Fernández de Córdoba, Gómez de Parada, Lara, Lorenz de Rada, Pérez de Salazar, Ruiz de Velasco, Valdivieso, De Haro y Tamariz, Fagoaga, Echeverz, Dávalos de Bracamonte, Peón, Gutiérrez-Altamirano, Castañiza, Gómez de la Cortina, Urrutia, Velasco, Moncada, Diez de Sollano, de Busto y Moya, Reynoso y Manso de Zúñiga, Capetillo, de la Parra, Villaseñor-Cervantes, Villaseñor-Jasso, López de Zárate, Camino, Caserta, Trebuesto, Ruiz de Esparza, García de Teruel, Espinosa de los Monteros, Vizcarra, Rábago, Sardaneta, Martínez del Río, Ozta, Azcárate y Ledesma, de la Torre Ledesma, Molina Flores, Vera Martinez y Cazarez, Samaniego del Castillo, Lemus, Mier,  De la Maza, González de Betolaza, López de Peralta, Padilla, Diez-Gutiérrez, Flores-Alatorre, Cosío, Rivadeneyra, de la Cotera, de la Campa y Cos, Rodríguez Sáenz de Pedroso, Padilla, Rivascacho, Villar-Villamil, Rodríguez Rico, Sánchez de Tagle, Báez de Benavides, Cabrero, Hurtado de Mendoza, López-Portillo, García Pimentel, Meade, Sánchez-Saráchaga, Sainz-Trápaga, Villaurrutia, Errazu, Escandón, Heredia de la Pierre, Quintanar, Beovide, Alvarez de Medina, Sánchez de Aldana, Siles, Yermo, de Yturbe, de Béistegui, de Rivera, Zubaran-Capmany and Sánchez-Navarro, among others.

Members of the Rincón Gallardo, Romay-Basail, Fagoaga and Pimentel families (marqués de Guadalupe, señor de Cadro y Monterroso, marqués del Apartado and conde de Heras Soto) were active in Mexico City government, the ministry of Foreign Affairs, the Senate, the armed forces, and the Academia de la Lengua or the Sociedad de Geografía e Historia.  Many journeyed and lived abroad, often doing so in Paris, London, and Madrid. Many men from these families studied at British public or private schools, as has been the custom since before independence.

Foreign nobility in Mexico 

 
Throughout the 19th century several Mexican individuals and their descendants received titles of nobility from nations foreign to the Mexican State, including the Vatican (an Elective Absolute Monarchy), the Kingdom of Spain (a Hereditary Constitutional Monarchy), and others. As well, many bearers of foreign titles have moved to Mexico during its long history, adding themselves to the local nobility.

Pontifical nobility 
Pontifical titles of nobility (the Pope or Pontiff is legally a monarch and until recently, still issued new titles of nobility), and in some cases had these titles recognized as "Foreign titles" in the Kingdom of Spain. These titles are sometimes known as títulos negros and include the titles of the marqués de Barrón, conde de Subervielle, conde del Valle (Fernández del Valle family), duque de Mier, amongst others. Many of these families were previously part of the Mexican and Spanish hidalgo class, while others proceeded from France or other countries.

Spanish nobility 
Several titles which were in existence at the time of the Spanish rule over Mexico are still legally recognized to this day by the Kingdom of Spain, although very few continued to pass down through the same families following their prohibition in Mexico, falling in the hands of distant or obscure Spanish relatives who spend great sums for "rehabilitating" them through the 19th and 20th centuries.

In addition, a few Mexican families who permanently or temporarily settled in Spain after Mexican Independence continued to be granted distinctions and titles of nobility from the Spanish monarchs, such as the Duke of Regla (Grandee of Spain), Marquess of Morante, Duchess of Prim (Grandee of Spain), Marquess of Bermejillo del Rey, amongst others. Other Mexican individuals acquired their titles jure uxoris (through marriage), passing them down to their descendants, such as the Duke of Castro-Terreño (Grandee of Spain), Marquess of Montehermoso, Count of Triviana, Count of Echauz and Count of Ezpeleta de Veire (all held by the Mexican Sánchez-Navarro family). Mexican-born Don Ventura García-Sancho e Ibarrondo (1837–1914), both received the Spanish title of Count of Consuegra and became Duke of Nájera (Grandee of Spain), also Marquess of Aguilar de Campoo, amongst many other titles through marriage (passed down to his descendants).

Other members of Spanish nobility moved to Mexico for different reasons, taking their titles with them and bequeathing them to their Mexican descendants. These include the Duke of Sessa (Grandee of Spain), Count of Altamira, the Duke of Huete (Grandee of Spain), amongst many others.

French nobility 
Several members of the French nobility passed to Mexico through different times in history, including the descendants of Louis Jucherau de Saint-Denis, those of count Melchior de Polignac (through his marriage to Susana de la Torre y Mier, sister of Ignacio de la Torre y Mier), including their son Prince Pierre, Duke of Valentinois, and through him the present Princely House of Monaco.

Austrian nobility 
Archduke Felix of Habsburg and his wife Princess Ana Eugenia d'Arenberg, settled in Mexico after the fall of the Austrian Empire in 1918, with most of their offspring remaining in Mexico ever since. Archduke Felix was the son of the last Emperor of Austria (Emperor Charles I of Austria) and great-grand nephew of Maximilian I of Mexico.

Italian nobility 
Members of the Italian nobility were present in Mexico as soon as the 16th century, including a contingency of Genoese bankers that partially funded the Cortés Expedition (the Genoese represented one third of the troops of Cortés). Princess Maria Beatrice of Savoy, daughter of the last King of Italy, Umberto II, also settled in Mexico after the fall of the Italian monarchy, having married Argentinian diplomat Luis Reyna-Corvallán in Ciudad Juárez. Other members of the Italian nobility include members of the Mapelli-Mozzi, Caravita di Sirignano, and many others. At the end of the 19th century, the Marquess of Grimaldi was one of the major landowners of the State of Veracruz.

Polish nobility 
French-born Mexican author Elena Poniatowska (nicknamed "The Red Princess") is the daughter of Prince Jean-Joseph Poniatowski and Mexican-born María Dolores Amor e Yturbe, herself a cousin of Carlos de Beistegui.

Current status
At the beginning of the 20th century, the Mexican nobility – both titled and untitled – consisted of approximately 1.5% of Mexico's population, or approximately 200,000 people. The Political Constitution of Mexico expressly prohibits the state from recognizing (or granting) any titles of nobility since 1917. Mexicans are also prohibited from accepting foreign distinctions without permission from the Congress of the Union.

Gallery

See also

 Mexican Empire
 Viceroyalty of the New Spain
 Spanish Empire
 First Mexican Empire
 Second Mexican Empire
 Mexican heraldry
 Monarchism in Mexico
 Mexican Academy of Genealogy and Heraldry
 House of Iturbide
 Martínez del Río
 Villagómez family
 House of Romay

Notes

External links
Lopez De La Cadena, Alberto Homero, https://web.archive.org/web/20090413013353/http://www.cryptojews.com/Our_Secret_Heritage.htm
Macias-González, Victor M. "The Mexican Aristocracy in the Porfirian Foreign Service." Book Manuscript Summary

 
Titles of nobility in the Americas